Mike Clark is an American football coach and college athletic administrator. He is the head football coach and athletic director at Lycoming College in Williamsport, Pennsylvania.

Head coaching record

References

External links
 Lycoming profile

Year of birth missing (living people)
Living people
American football offensive linemen
Davidson Wildcats football coaches
Lycoming Warriors athletic directors
Lycoming Warriors football coaches
Lycoming Warriors football players
Princeton Tigers football coaches
Rowan Profs football coaches